Anderson & Lembke (A&L) was a Swedish business-to-business advertising agency started in 1963. It expanded its operations into several countries from the 1970s to 1990s, but the last agency using the original name closed its doors in 2001.

History
Anderson & Lembke was started by Bengt Anderson and Rolf Lembke in Stockholm, 1963. In their work at Atlas Copco, they realised how industrial goods were marketed using cheap black and white leaflets, while consumer goods marketers used high quality design, printing and attention-grabbing media advertising. Their business idea became to adapt techniques used in consumer marketing to products sold for professional use. Anderson and Lembke realised that engineering-oriented business-to-business companies often lacked basic marketing planning skills, and made it part of their business idea to help their clients towards more professional marketing thinking. Their new agency started to attract export-oriented Swedish manufacturers such as bearings giant SKF and welding equipment maker Esab.

Expansion
In the early 1970s, Anderson & Lembke started expanding outside Sweden by establishing an agency in Helsinki, Finland. In 1979, Anderson & Lembke entered the UK market by opening an office in London. Another A&L agency based in Stamford, Connecticut since 1982 became very successful in the North American market, winning creative awards and attracting major technology clients such as Microsoft and Sun Microsystems.

By the year 1984, the A&L group included four companies in Stockholm and agencies in Gothenburg, Helsingborg, Helsinki, Oslo, London, and Stamford. Their combined personnel was 170 and annual sales around US$65 million. The UK agency soon changed ownership through a management buyout and expanded into Basingstoke and Bristol before being merged with McCann-Erickson in 2001. Anderson & Lembke USA saw another management buyout in 1985 by the agency's top names Hans Ullmark and Steve Trygg, who soon sold their agency on to Chiat/Day/Mojo. They expanded Anderson & Lembke Inc. into San Francisco, Amsterdam and Hongkong. In 1992, Ullmark and Trygg bought the agency back from Chiat/Dayltä, and in 1995 Anderson & Lembke was sold to McCann Erickson. The resulting agency became the fifth largest ad agency in San Francisco with some 340 employees.
 
Independently from each other, and under separate ownerships, the A&L agencies in the United States and the UK were closed in 2001. The Paris-based La Rochefoucauld, Anderson & Lembke was merged with Territoires, a Publicis group agency in 2000. The Helsinki agency went bankrupt in 1991, but continued as A&L Advertising, then as A&L Grey until the late 1990s.

References

Advertising agencies of Sweden
Advertising agencies of the United Kingdom
Advertising agencies of the United States
Advertising agencies of Finland
Advertising agencies of the Netherlands
Advertising agencies of France
Defunct companies of Sweden